Cotorra is a town and municipality located in the Córdoba Department, northern Colombia.

See also
 Cotora

References
 Gobernacion de Cordoba - Cotorra

Córdoba